"Moon over Bourbon Street" is the fifth single from Sting's solo debut album The Dream of the Blue Turtles.  It reached No. 44 on the UK singles chart.

Song information
Sting has said that he composed the song in New Orleans and that it was inspired by Anne Rice's gothic noir novel Interview with the Vampire which is partially set in the French Quarter of the city.  The song reached No. 44 on the British singles chart.

Sting himself has said  of the composition..."That was inspired by a book by Anne Rice, called Interview with the Vampire, a beautiful book about this vampire which is a vampire by accident. He's immortal and he has to kill people to live, but he's been left with his conscience intact. He's this wonderful, poignant soul who has to do evil, yet wants to stop. Once again, it's the duality which interested me." He also said that although it was inspired by the Rice novel that "there was one moonlit night in the French Quarter of New Orleans where I had the distinct impression that I was being followed ..." (an occurrence which also contributed to the tune's genesis).

Sting plays double bass on this track..

In 2003, Sting re-recorded the song as a B-side on the single ‘Send Your Love’, which peaked at No. 30 on the UK music charts.

The title of the song references the historic French Quarter of New Orleans route of Bourbon Street.

References

Sting (musician) songs
Songs about New Orleans
Songs about streets
1985 songs
Works based on The Vampire Chronicles